The Bagpipe Museum is a currently-defunct museum previously located in Ellicott City, Maryland, United States.

The museum displayed a collection of over a hundred bagpipes from throughout Europe, and maintained a large collection of bagpipe recordings and publications, as well as reproducing rare sheet music for the pipes.

The Bagpipe Museum, which opened in 1997, closed down in the late 2000s when the historic mill in which it was located was sold to developers. The collection has been maintained and there are tentative plans to re-establish the museum at a new location.

See also 
 List of music museums

References

Museums established in 1997
Bagpipe museums
Musical instrument museums in the United States
Defunct museums in Maryland
Tourist attractions in Howard County, Maryland
1997 establishments in Maryland